Hram Hall is an indoor handball arena in Kać, Serbia. It is the home of RK Jugović.

See also
List of indoor arenas in Serbia

External links
 Official website of Handball club Jugović

Handball venues in Serbia